The coat of arms of Karelia may refer to

 Coat of arms of the Republic of Karelia in the Russian Federation
 Coat of arms of the Province of Karelia in Finland

See also
 Emblem of the Karelo-Finnish Soviet Socialist Republic 1941–1956